Kottappuzha is a tributary of Kuthirappuzha which is a tributary of Chaliyar river in Kerala, India. Kottappuzha originates from the western slopes of Upper Bhavani reservoir in Nilgiris district of Tamil Nadu. Near Kottappuzha palam (bridge), about 1.5 km south of Pookkottumpadam 'Chokkadan puzha' a river from Kozhippara hills and which passes through Chokkad join with Kottappuzha. At Koorad, Kottappuzha meets Kuthirappuzha.

Rivers of Malappuram district